Alexander Schmidt (born 19 January 1998) is an Austrian footballer who plays for F.C. Vizela.

Early life
Schmidt was born in Vienna to a Senegalese father, Samba Diallo, and an Austrian mother, Karin Schmidt, from whom he inherits his surname. He has two sisters, fellow footballer Catherine Schmidt, who plays for SKN St. Pölten women's team, and Marie Schmidt.

Club career
He made his Austrian Football First League debut for Liefering on 1 November 2016 in a game against Austria Lustenau.

He scored the winning goal for Red Bull Salzburg against Benfica in the final of the 2016–17 UEFA Youth League.

On 15 August 2020, he signed a three-year contract with LASK and was loaned to St. Pölten for the 2020–21 season.

References

External links

 

1998 births
Living people
Footballers from Vienna
Austrian footballers
Association football forwards
FC Liefering players
Wolfsberger AC players
LASK players
SKN St. Pölten players
2. Liga (Austria) players
Austrian Football Bundesliga players
Austria youth international footballers
Austria under-21 international footballers
Austrian people of Senegalese descent